Daniel Aaron Aloni or Dan Aloni (born August 19, 1964) is an American talent agent at William Morris Endeavor (WME), an entertainment and media agency, where he is a partner and member of the Leadership Committee. He was previously a partner at Creative Artists Agency (CAA) and United Talent Agency (UTA).

Background
Born in Los Angeles, California, Aloni was raised in Sherman Oaks. His father, Tel-Aviv-born Aminadav Aloni (1928-1999), a pianist and composer, was renowned for his Jewish compositions. Aloni's mother, Joanne, is a UCLA fine art graduate.

Aloni graduated from U.S. Grant High School, where he played varsity tennis all four years. He earned a degree in Economics and Political Science from the University of California at Berkeley. He served as Class of 1986 Class Secretary and Director of the Cal Alumni Association.

Career
Some of his notable clients include Christopher Nolan, Jim Carrey, Mike Myers, Jay Roach, Michel Gondry, John Carney, John Crowley, David Goyer, and Gavin O'Connor.

He began his career in finance, working as an analyst at JP Morgan in New York from 1987 to 1988.  He moved on to Goldman Sachs, where he was a senior analyst from 1988 to 1990. Realizing his real interest was in the entertainment industry, he moved back to Los Angeles in 1991 and started as an agent's assistant at the Gersh Agency.

From 1991 through 2005, Aloni worked at UTA, where he rose to partner and Head of the Motion Pictures Department. In 2005, he made a highly publicized move to Creative Artists Agency (CAA), taking the majority of his clients with him.  Aloni remained at CAA for seven years, where he was a partner in the Motion Picture Department.  It was reported that he was unhappy while at CAA. In 2012, after failing to agree on a contract renewal, Aloni was fired from the agency.

He immediately started at William Morris Endeavor (WME) as a partner in the Motion Picture Department. He has been at WME/IMG from 2012 to present, as partner and as a member of the Leadership Committee.

Controversy
Aloni had an abrupt exit from CAA after being courted by WME's Ari Emanuel.  It was seen as one of the biggest agent moves in years, In what was considered shocking for the industry, all of Aloni's clients followed him to WME.

Philanthropy
Aloni has been active on the board of trustees of the Broad Stage, a Los Angeles, California-based nonprofit organization, and the Cedars Sinai Heart Foundation. Since 2012, he has served on the board of directors for Providence St. John's Hospital in Santa Monica, California.

He is also a member of the Academy of Arts and Sciences.

Art collection
Aloni is very active in the contemporary art world, and is known as a top collector.

References

External links
http://www.imdb.com/name/nm0022090/

1964 births
Living people
American talent agents
UC Berkeley College of Letters and Science alumni